Luancheng is a town in and the seat of Luancheng District of Shijiazhuang, in southwestern Hebei province, China, about  south of the provincial capital of Shijiazhuang along China National Highway 308. , it has 47 villages under its administration.

Transport 
It is served by the Shijiazhuang Luancheng Airport .

See also
List of township-level divisions of Hebei

References

Township-level divisions of Hebei